Lahuta may refer to:

 Lahuta or gusle, a single-stringed musical instrument
 Lahutā, a Buddhist term
 Ukrainian form of the surname Laguta
 Hennadiy Lahuta (born 1974), Ukrainian politician

See also